Jaime French (born June 20, 1989) is an American comedian, YouTuber and make-up artist.

French has received attention for viral videos on YouTube.

Personal life
Jaime owns a grey parrot named Ember. She lives in Missouri with her husband Nick, whom she married in 2010. She has an older sister named Jenna and two nephews, Austin and Sam.

Jaime's content includes reviews of makeup "hacks", fashion hauls, and synopsis-commentary of films with green screen insertions of herself into film scenes for comedic effect.

References

American YouTubers
Living people
1989 births
YouTube channels launched in 2016